Acronicta clarescens, commonly known as the clear dagger moth, is a species of moth in the family Noctuidae. It is found in North America.

The wingspan is about 40 mm. Adults are on wing from May to August depending on the location.

The larvae feed on apple, cherry, mountain ash, plum and wild black cherry.

External links
Bug Guide
Lepidoptera of Wayne County, Ohio

Acronicta
Moths of North America
Moths described in 1852